Novopetrovka may refer to the following places in Russia:

Novopetrovka, Altai Krai
Novopetrovka, Blagoveshchensky District, Amur Oblast
Novopetrovka, Konstantinovsky District, Amur Oblast
Novopetrovka, Karmaskalinsky District, Republic of Bashkortostan
Novopetrovka, Sharansky District, Republic of Bashkortostan

See also
 
 Novopetrovsk (disambiguation)
 Novopetrovsky (disambiguation)